Star for a Night may refer to:

Star for a Night (film), American drama, 1936
Star for a Night (British TV series), BBC One talent show, 1999-2001
Star for a Night (Philippine TV series), IBC singing contest, 2002-2003